Markovian is an adjective that may describe:
 In probability theory and statistics, subjects named for Andrey Markov:
 A Markov chain or Markov process, a stochastic model describing a sequence of possible events 
 The Markov property, the memoryless property of a stochastic process
 The Markovians, an extinct god-like species in Jack L. Chalker's Well World series of novels

 Markovian Parallax Denigrate, references a mysterious series of Usenet messages

See also 
 Markov (surname)